K-1 WORLD MAX 2007 World Championship Final was a kickboxing event promoted by the K-1 organization.  It was the sixth annual K-1 World MAX final for middleweight kickboxers (70 kg/154 lb weight class), involving eight finalists and four reserve fighters, with all bouts fought under K-1 rules.  Seven of the finalists had won elimination fights at the K-1 World MAX 2007 World Tournament Final Elimination, while the eighth, Gago Drago, had been invited despite losing his elimination match.  Another defeated elimination fighter Virgil Kalakoda would be called up to take part in a reserve fight, while the other three reservists were invitees.  As well as tournament fights there was an opening fight and two super fights fought under K-1 rules (various weight classes).  In total there were eighteen fighters at the event, representing ten countries.  

The tournament was won by shoot boxer Andy Souwer who won his second K-1 MAX world final by defeating home favorite Masato who was also vying for his second tournament victory, in what was a rematch from the previous years semi final.  After a close first round in which Masato was the aggressor, Souwer turned it on in the second, his low kicks wearing out the Japanese fighter forcing an exhausted and hurt Masato unable to come out for the third round.  A delighted Souwer was presented as the victor, dedicating the victory to his recently born second child.  It had been a competitive tournament with both finalists having had to work hard to make the final – Souwer had defeated the tough Gago Drago and fellow countryman and 2002 champion Albert Kraus, while Masato had defeated x2 K-1 MAX world champion Buakaw and newcomer Artur Kyshenko – with the victory against Buakaw in particular leaving its toll on Masato.  The event was held at the Nippon Budokan in Tokyo, Japan on Wednesday, October 3, 2007 in front of a full house of 14,231.

K-1 World MAX 2007 World Championship Final

* Gago Drago was invited to the Final despite losing his elimination fight

Results

See also
List of K-1 Events
List of K-1 champions
List of male kickboxers

References

External links
K-1 Official Website
K-1sport.de - Your Source for Everything K-1

K-1 MAX events
2007 in kickboxing
Kickboxing in Japan
Sports competitions in Tokyo